The U Line is a driverless, fully automatic, grade-separated light rail or light metro line in Uijeongbu, Seoul Capital Area, South Korea. The "U" is short for the city Uijeongbu. The line uses Véhicule Automatique Léger (VAL) 208 trains built by Siemens Transportation Systems. The system is very similar to the Toulouse Metro, Lille Metro and Rennes Metro in France.

Single rides cost 1,550 won. During rush hours trains come every 3 and a half minutes with trains coming every 6 to 10 minutes during all other hours. Trains are in service 19.5 hours a day, from 5 am until 12:30 am. From Balgok Station to Tapseok Station, the U Line will take riders 19 minutes and 54 seconds, versus a car, at 31 minutes 6 seconds, or a public bus, taking 40 minutes and 6 seconds. Two extensions are planned.

After four and a half years of operating at a continual loss, a debt of 240 billion won prompted board members of the Uijeongbu Light Rail Transit Company to file for bankruptcy in late 2016. If the Seoul Central District Court agrees to the filing then operation reverts to the city government. On 5 January 2017, Uijeongbu Mayor Ahn Byung-yong promised the line would continue operation.

History

 1995 December – Initial planning
 2004 August – GS Construction Consortium is picked
 2005 October – Operating company is established
 2007 July – Construction groundbreaking ceremony
 2007 August – Full construction begins
 2011 Summer – All track has been laid
 2011 Fall – Signal work completion
 2012 February to June- Testing of system
 2012 June 29–30 – Free rides prior to official opening 
 2012 July 1 – Revenue service begins
 2014 December 6 – Joins metropolitan unity fare allowing transfers to other lines and buses. Fares start from 1,350, with a flat 300 won extra charge if transferring from Line 1.

Fares
The U Line is physically connected to the Seoul Metropolitan Subway system and allows payment via the T-money smart card. It allows transfer to other lines and buses since 6 December 2014. Discounts are available for youth and free rides exist for those over 65 years of age.

Stations
There is no station numbered U116.

See also
Subways in South Korea
Seoul Metropolitan Subway

References

External links
U Line – official website 
Uijeongbu VAL system at UrbanRail.Net
U Line Naver Blog 

 
Light rail in South Korea
Uijeongbu
Seoul Metropolitan Subway lines